is one of the wards in Fukuoka-shi, Fukuoka-ken, Kyūshū, Japan.

Data 
Population: 213,178 people (as of January 1, 2012)
Area: 95.88 square kilometers (the largest in Fukuoka-shi)

History 
On April 1, 1889, Fukuoka-shi was founded. The northeastern part of Sawara-gun (早良郡) was merged into Fukuoka-shi.

On April 1, 1972, Fukuoka-shi was designated as a government ordinance city. Fukuoka-shi was subdivided into five wards: Hakata-ku, Chūō-ku, Higashi-ku, Minami-ku and the former Nishi-ku. The area of Sawara-ku was the central part of the former Nishi-ku.

On March 1, 1975, Sawara-machi (早良町) was merged into Fukuoka-shi.

On May 10, 1982, the former Nishi-ku was subdivided into three wards: Sawara-ku, Jōnan-ku and Nishi-ku. Sawara-ku was named after what had been the central part of Sawara-gun.

Places 
Momochihama (百道浜): Fukuoka Tower, Fukuoka City Museum, Fukuoka City Library
Nishijin (西新): Nishijin Praliva
Fujisaki (藤崎): Sawara Ward Office, Fukuoka Prefecture Sawara Police Station, Fujisaki Bus Terminal
Hara (原): Aeon Hara
Noke (野芥)
Higashiirube (東入部): Sawara Ward Irube Branch Office

Schools

Universities and colleges 
Seinan Gakuin University at Nishijin
Fukuoka Dental College at Tamura (田村)

Other schools 
Seinan Gakuin Junior and Senior High School at Momochihama
Fukuoka Prefecture Shūyūkan High School at Nishijin
Fukuoka International School at Momochi (百道)
Fukuoka Prefecture Kōrinkan High School (the former Nishifukuoka High School) at Arita (有田)

Stations 
Fukuoka City Subway Kūkō Line: Nishijin, Fujisaki, Muromi (室見)
Fukuoka City Subway Nanakuma Line: Noke, Kamo (賀茂), Jirōmaru (次郎丸)

Avenues and streets

National 
Route 202 (Imajuku-shindō)
Route 202 Bypass (Fukuoka Sotokanjō-dōro)
Route 263 (Sawara-gaidō (早良街道))

Prefectural 
Route 49
Route 56
Route 136
Route 558 (Hara-dōri, the former Sawara-kaidō (旧早良街道))
Route 559 (Imajuku-shindō)

Municipal 
Chiyo-Imajuku Line (Meiji-dōri)
Nishijin-Arae Line (Sawara-gaidō)

Rivers 
Muromi-gawa (室見川)
Kanakuzu-gawa (金屑川)
Aburayama-gawa (油山川)

External links 

Wards of Fukuoka